Penicillium anatolicum is a fungus species of the genus of Penicillium which was isolated in Turkey, Florida, in the United States and in South Africa.

See also
List of Penicillium species

References

Further reading
 

anatolicum
Fungi described in 1968